The men's high jump competition at the 2004 Summer Olympics in Athens was held at the Olympic Stadium on 20–22 August. Thirty-eight athletes from 27 nations competed. The event was won by Stefan Holm of Sweden, the nation's first victory in the men's high jump and first medal in the event since Patrik Sjöberg won three in a row from 1984 to 1992. Matt Hemingway took silver, returning the United States to the podium after a one-Games absence. Jaroslav Bába's bronze was the first medal in the event for the Czech Republic.

Background

This was the 25th appearance of the event, which is one of 12 athletics events to have been held at every Summer Olympics. The returning finalists from the 2000 Games were bronze medalist Abderrahmane Hammad of Algeria, fourth-place finisher Stefan Holm of Sweden, sixth-place finishers Mark Boswell of Canada and Staffan Strand of Sweden, and tenth-place finisher Vyacheslav Voronin of Russia. Dragutin Topić competed under for the fourth time, under his third flag (the Olympic flag as an Independent Olympic Participant in 1992, Yugoslavia in 1996 and 2000, and now Serbia and Montenegro). Holm was favored; he had placed second at the 2003 world championship (the winner, Jacques Freitag, was present in Athens but injured) and "had won 17 consecutive meets leading up to Athina."

Cyprus, Serbia and Montenegro, Slovenia, and Sri Lanka each made their debut in the event. The United States made its 24th appearance, most of any nation, having missed only the boycotted 1980 Games.

Qualification

The qualification period for Athletics was 1 January 2003 to 9 August 2004. For the men's high jump, each National Olympic Committee was permitted to enter up to three athletes that had jumped 2.30 metres or higher during the qualification period. The maximum number of athletes per nation had been set at 3 since the 1930 Olympic Congress. If an NOC had no athletes that qualified under that standard, one athlete that had jumped 2.27 metres or higher could be entered.

Competition format

The competition consisted of two rounds, qualification and final. Athletes start with a qualifying round. Jumping in turn, each athlete attempts to achieve the qualifying height. If they fail at three jumps in a row, they are eliminated. After a successful jump, they receive three more attempts to achieve the next height. Once all jumps have been completed, all athletes who have achieved the qualifying height go through to the final. If fewer than 12 athletes achieve the qualifying standard, the best 12 athletes go through. Cleared heights reset for the final, which followed the same format until all athletes fail three consecutive jumps.

Records

, the existing world and Olympic records were as follows.

No new records were set during the competition.

Schedule

All times are Greece Standard Time (UTC+2)

Results

Qualifying round
Rule: Qualifying standard 2.28 (Q) or at least best 12 qualified (q).

* Aleksey Lesnichiy was disqualified after failing an anti-doping test.

Final

References

External links
Official Olympic Report

M
High jump at the Olympics
Men's events at the 2004 Summer Olympics